Mancinella herberti is a species of sea snail, a marine gastropod mollusk, in the family Muricidae, the murex snails or rock snails.

Description
The length of the shell attains 33 mm.

Distribution
This marine species occurs off KwaZulu-Natal, South Africa.

References

herberti
Gastropods described in 1998